High Road or The High Road may refer to:

Film and television
 High Road (film), a 2012 comedy by Matt Walsh
 The Lady of Scandal, a 1930 American pre-Code film, also known as The High Road
 The High Road (1915 film), a lost silent film
 Take the High Road or High Road, a soap opera
 "The High Road" (Person of Interest), an episode of Person of Interest
 John Gunther's High Road, a 1959–1960 TV series hosted by John Gunther

Literature
 The High Road (play), a 1927 comedy play by Frederick Lonsdale
 The High Road (novel), a 1988 novel by Edna O'Brien
 High Roads (comics), a comic book series created by Scott Lobdell and Leinil Francis Yu

Music
Kilburn and the High Roads, a band of Ian Dury

Albums
 High Road (The Grapes of Wrath album) (2013)
 The High Road (album), a 2006 album by JoJo
 High Road (Kesha album) (2020)
 High Road (Night Ranger album) (2014) or its title track
 The High Road (EP), a 1983 EP by Roxy Music
 The High Road, an album by Mudmen

Songs

 "The High Road" (Broken Bells song) (2009)
 "High Road" (Mastodon song) (2014)
 "The High Road" (Three Days Grace song) (2013)
 "High Road", a song by Fort Minor from The Rising Tied
 "The High Road", a 1966 song by Lil' Bob and the Lollipops

Places
 High Road, Perth
 Chiswick High Road
 Kilburn High Road
 Streatham High Road
 Tottenham High Road

See also
 "The Bonnie Banks o' Loch Lomond"
 High Street (disambiguation)
 Team High Road and Team High Road Women professional cycling teams